Peter Geoffrey Taylor (1926–2011) was a British botanist who worked at Royal Botanic Gardens, Kew throughout his career in botany. Taylor was born in 1926 and joined the staff of the herbarium at Kew in 1948. He published his first new species, Utricularia pentadactyla, in 1954. In 1973, Taylor was appointed curator of the orchid division of the herbarium and, according to Kew, "under his direction, orchid taxonomy was revitalised and its horticultural contacts strengthened."

One of Taylor's main botanical focuses was the genus Utricularia. He authored many species in the genus and provided the most comprehensive monograph on the genus in 1986 and revised in 1989  as The genus Utricularia - a taxonomic monograph. The bladderworts Utricularia petertaylorii and Utricularia tayloriana are named in his honour, as are Acacia taylorii, Chaetopoa taylorii, Genlisea taylorii, Indigofera taylorii, Karina tayloriana, Platystele taylorii, Phyllanthus taylorianus, and Spermacoce taylorii. Genlisea subgen. Tayloria (and by extension Genlisea sect. Tayloria) are also named after him.

References 

 Schnell, Donald. (1991).  Carnivorous Plant Newsletter 20(1–2): 4–5.
 Schnell, Donald. (1991).  Carnivorous Plant Newsletter 20(1–2): 6–7.
 Taylor, Peter. (1991).  Carnivorous Plant Newsletter 20(1–2): 34–43.

Further reading
From the June 2012 issue of the Carnivorous Plant Newsletter, dedicated to the memory of Peter Taylor:
 van den Broek, M. 2012. Peter Geoffrey Taylor 1926-2011. Carnivorous Plant Newsletter 41(2): 44.
 Taylor, G. 2012. Memories of Peter Geoffrey Taylor (1926-2011). Carnivorous Plant Newsletter 41(2): 45–51.
 Harley, R.M. 2012. My memories of Peter Taylor. Carnivorous Plant Newsletter 41(2): 52–53.
 Rice, B.A. 2012. In memory of a mentor. Carnivorous Plant Newsletter 41(2): 54–55.
 Schlauer, J. 2012. Peter Taylor's nomenclatural legacy (Phanerogams). Carnivorous Plant Newsletter 41(2): 56–66.
 Fleischmann, A. 2012. The new Utricularia species described since Peter Taylor's monograph. Carnivorous Plant Newsletter 41(2): 67–76.

External links 
IPNI profile

1926 births
2011 deaths
British botanists